John F. Kennedy High School, a member of the Sacramento City Unified School District, is a public school in the Pocket-Greenhaven Area of Sacramento, California.

Small Learning Communities

Health Education Law and Marines (HELM)
Health Education Law and Marines is an SLC that focuses on preparing students for the education and medical fields. Through speakers, community, links and internship opportunities, students will have a myriad of opportunities to participate in related experiences. HELM also houses the Criminal Justice Academy; which has a partnership with the Sacramento Police Department and MCJROTC, where students are part of the Marine Corps Junior Reserve Officers Training Course.

Program in America and California Explorations (PACE)
Program in America and California Explorations is a Small Learning Community (SLC) at John F. Kennedy High School, which focuses on academic excellence, culture and civic events, and community service. PACE students are required to complete 30 hours community service or volunteering hours to pass your PACE classes each semester, as well as Cultural and Civic events. Students are required to complete two field trips at the end of the year. PACE emphasizes California history and literature.

Manufacturing and Design (MaD)
Manufacturing and Design provides opportunities for students interested in pursuing careers in engineering, automotive, and architecture fields with an emphasis on technical skills necessary to secure gainful employment. Business and college connections are valuable aspects of the program.

Visual and Performing Arts (VAPA)
Visual and Performing Arts focuses on the core curriculum with an emphasis on music, drama, dance and art. Expressing one's creativity is important to being a well-rounded, successful member of society. VAPA encourages students to participant in events over the summer and throughout the school year.

Notable alumni

 Adam Bernero - seven-year MLB pitcher
 La Vel Freeman - former MLB designated hitter
 Brotha Lynch Hung - Rapper and Community Activist
 Scott Moak - public address announcer of the Sacramento Kings
 Gift of Gab (Tim Parker) who is better known as part of the hip hop duo Blackalicious
 Eric Mar - San Francisco County Supervisor, former School Board Member, and Professor at San Francisco State University
 Geno Petralli - 12-year MLB catcher
 Michael Stewart - former NBA center who played for five teams
 Greg Vaughn - four-time MLB All-Star outfielder
 Cornel West - class of 1970, prominent African-American scholar
 Brandi Glanville - Reality TV personality featured on Bravo TV's The Real Housewives of Beverly Hills, and NY Times best-selling author*
 Lawrence Frostad - class of 1985, 1992 Olympian Swimmer.

References

External links
 Kennedy High School Homepage
 District Home Page
 Kennedy Library Home Page
 PACE Official Website

High schools in Sacramento, California
Public high schools in California
1967 establishments in California
Monuments and memorials to John F. Kennedy in the United States